This is a list of natural gas vehicles.

Airplanes

 Tu-155 only experimental
 Tu-206 a LNG version is available as the Tu-206
 Tu-330 a LNG version is available of this transport/survey/tanker aircraft

Helicopters
 Mil Mi-8 only experimental

Passenger cars
 Audi A5 2,0 TFSI CNG (planned) (unveiled 12/07)
 BMW 3 Series (E36) 316g CNG
 BMW 5 Series (E34) 518g CNG
 Chevrolet Cavalier Bi-Fuel CNG
 Citroën C3 1,4 GNV man.
 Citroën Berlingo Multispace 1,4 GNV (MPV) man.
 Dacia Logan 1,6 K4M CNG
 Fiat Panda Natural Power
 Fiat 500 Natural Power
 Fiat Punto 1,2 60 Natural Power/BiPower
 Fiat Grande Punto 1,4 Natural Power/BiPower
 Fiat Multipla Natural Power/Bipower
 Fiat Marea Bipower
 Fiat Doblò SX 1,6 Natural Power/BiPower
 Fiat Siena Tetrafuel
 Ford Crown Victoria CNG
 Ford Contour Bi-Fuel CNG
 Ford Fusion CNG (CH)
 Ford Focus CNG (CH)
 Ford Focus C-Max CNG
 Ford S-Max CNG (CH)
 Ford Mondeo Sedan/STW CNG (CH)
 Ford Galaxy CNG (CH)
 Ford Tourneo (MPV) CNG
 Ford Kuga CNG (CH)
 Ford Maverick CNG (CH)
 Honda Civic CNG
 Honda Civic GX CNG
 Honda CR-V CNG
 Kia Pride (4D) CNG
 Mercedes-Benz B170/B200K NGT (W245) automatic
 Mercedes-Benz C200K T NGT wagon (S207) automatic
 Mercedes-Benz E200K NGT sedan (W211) automatic
 Opel Combo 1,6 CNG Comfort
 Opel Zafira 5D 1,6 CNG Comfort (MPV)
 Opel Astra k 1,4 ecotec CNG
 Peugeot 405 (SD) CNG
 Peugeot 206 (SD) V20 CNG
 Peugeot 207 (3D/5D/SW/CC) VTi CNG (CH)
 Peugeot 308 (3D/5D/SW) VTi CNG (CH)
 Peugeot 405 (4D) CNG
 Peugeot 807 2,0 CNG (CH)
 Peugeot Pars (4D) CNG
 Peugeot Partner 1,4 GNV (MPV) man.
 Proton Saga Iswara 1,3 L (modified)
 Proton Wira 1,3 / 1,5 / 1,6 Auto/Manual BiFuel – EFI Mixer Type (Converted)
 Proton Campro 1,6 BiFuel – EFI – using sequential type (Converted)
 Renault Kangoo 1,6 CNG (MPV)
 Samand (4D) CNG
 Škoda Octavia  1,4 TSI CNG G-Tec
 Škoda Citigo 1,0 CNG
 Suzuki Wagon R CNG/LPG
 Suzuki SX4 CNG
 Toyota Camry CNG
 Volkswagen GolfTGI 1.4 BlueMotion, Natural Gas, 81 kW (110 PS),Cubic Capacity:1395 cm, Fuel capacity (CNG): 15 kg, Fuel capacity (petrol): 50 L, Range (CNG): 420 km, Range (combined): 1360 km
 Volkswagen Caddy/Caddy Maxi Life EcoFuel CNG (MPV) man.
 Volkswagen Touran EcoFuel CNG (MPV) man.
 Volkswagen Passat Sedan/Variant 1,4 TSI EcoFuel CNG (unveiled 12/07) man/aut.(DSG)
 Volkswagen Transporter/Transporter Shuttle/Caravelle/Multivan T4/T5 2,0 I4/3,2 VR6 BiFuel/EcoFuel CNG and TSI EcoFuel CNG (latter planned) (MPV) (also LWB)
 Volkswagen Up! 50 kW (68 PS), Natural Gas, Fuel capacity: 11 kg CNG, Fuel capacity (petrol): 10 L, Range (CNG): 380 km, Range (combined): 600 km
 Volkswagen Transporter 2.0 Natural Gas, 85 kW (115 PS),Cubic Capacity:1.984 cm, Fuel capacity (CNG): 28 kg, Fuel capacity (petrol): 80 L, Range (CNG): 400 km, Range (combined): 1160 km, Fuel consumption combined: 7.3 kg/100 km
 Volvo C30 MultiFuel 1,8F (Gasoline/FFV E85/CNG) (CH)
 Volvo S40 MultiFuel 1.8F (Gasoline/FFV E85/CNG) (CH)
 Volvo V50 MultiFuel 1.8F (Gasoline/FFV E85/CNG) (CH)
 Volvo S60 Bi-Fuel CNG man/aut.
 Volvo V70 Bi-Fuel CNG man/aut.
 Volvo V70 MultiFuel 2.0F / 2.5FT (Gasoline/FFV E85/CNG) (CH)
 Volvo S80 Bi-Fuel CNG man/aut.
 Volvo S80 MultiFuel 2.0F / 2.5FT (Gasoline/FFV E85/CNG) (CH)
 Cars marked with (CH) available at least in Switzerland (http://www.erdgasfahren.ch/230.html)

Vans
 Chevrolet Express 6.0 V8 bifuel CNG and gasoline cargo and passenger 
 Citroën Berlingo 1,4 GNV
 Citroën Jumper GNV
 Dodge Caravan CNG
 Fiat Doblò Cargo BiPower
 Fiat Ducato BiPower
 Ford Transit 2,3 CNG (also LWB)
 GMC Savana 6.0 V8 bi fuel CNG and gasoline cargo and passenger
 Iveco Daily CNG
 Mercedes-Benz Sprinter 316 NGT (also LWB)
 Opel Combo 1,6 CNG Tour
 Peugeot Partner bivalent
 Peugeot Bipper CNG (CH)
 Peugeot Expert CNG (CH)
 Peugeot Boxer bivalent
 Renault Kangoo 1,6 CNG delivery van
 Volkswagen Caddy/Caddy Maxi EcoFuel CNG (a camping car/van version also available as the Caddy Life Tramper EcoFuel CNG)
 Volkswagen Eurovan (Transporter) T4/T5 2,0 I4/3,2 VR6 BiFuel/EcoFuel CNG and TSI EcoFuel CNG (latter planned) (also LWB)
Suzuki Mehran VX CNG BI FUEL
Chevy Express Van CNG (Note, limited range ~130 miles/tank)

Buses
NEFAZ CNG
Dennis
Dart/Dart SPD CNG
EvoBus (Mercedes-Benz)
Citaro/Citaro G/Citaro Ü CNG
OG 305
O 405 CNG
O 405 N/O 405 N²/O 405 NK/O 405 NÜ CNG
O 405 GN/O 405 GN² CNG
O 405 NH CNG (Australia Only)
OC 500 LE 1825 hG modular bus chassis
Iveco Bus
Iveco/Irisbus CityClass CNG
Renault/Irisbus Agora/Agora L GNV
Irisbus Citelis 12/Citelis 18 GNV
Isuzu
Erga Heavy-duty Bus
Erga Mio Medium-Duty Bus
MAN
SL200 CNG
SL202 CNG
NL202 CNG
NL232 CNG
NL243 CNG
NL313 CNG
NG 313 CNG
NÜ243 CNG
NÜ313 CNG
Neoplan
N 3316 Ü Euroliner
N 4007 CNG Centro Midigelenk
N 4409 CNG
N 4411 CNG Centroliner Solo
N 4413/1 CNG, N 4413/2 CNG
N 4416 CNG Centroliner Solo
N 4420 CNG Centroliner
N 4421 CNG Centroliner Gelenk
N 4426/3 CNG
New Flyer
CNG
C30LF
C35LF
C40LF
LNG
L30LF
L35LF
L40LF
North American Bus Industries
30 LFW CNG
35 LFW CNG
40 LFW CNG
COMPO 45 CNG
42 BRT CNG
60 BRT CNG articulated
Orion Bus Industries
I
V
VI
VII
VII Next Generation
Van Hool
A300 CNG
A308H CNG
A330 CNG
Volvo
Volvo B10L CNG
Volvo B10BLE CNG
Volvo B9L/B9LA CNG
Volvo 7700 CNG

Trucks
Kamaz CNG
Chevy Silverado CNG
Ford F-150 Dual Fuel (2001-2004)
Ford Super Duty 
GMC Sierra CNG
MAN CNG
Ram 2500
Volvo FL
Mercedes-Benz Econic
Iveco Stralis CNG
Scania G-Series CNG

Tanks
T-80

Waste collection vehicles

Mercedes-Benz Econic

Rocket car
Blue Flame